28 Camelopardalis is a star in the northern circumpolar constellation of Camelopardalis, located around 710 light years away from the Sun. It has an apparent visual magnitude of 6.79, which is below the normal limit for visibility to the naked eye. This star is moving further from the Earth with a heliocentric radial velocity of +20 km/s. It is a probable Ap star with a stellar classification of A7 V and an overabundance of chromium in the spectrum.

References

A-type main-sequence stars
Ap stars
Camelopardalis (constellation)
Durchmusterung objects
Camelopardalis, 28
038129
027283